The 10th Minnesota Infantry Regiment was a Minnesota USV infantry regiment that served in the Union Army during the American Civil War.

Service
The 10th Minnesota Infantry Regiment was recruited into Federal service at Garden City, Winnebago Agency, Fort Snelling and St. Paul, Minnesota, between August 12 and November 15, 1862. Militia that took part in the defense of New Ulm on 24-25 August 1862 were posted to the 10th afterwards.  
Companies G & I were at Fort Ridgely.  A Company I detachment was at both the Battle of Birch Coulee and the  Battle of Wood Lake.  In December Companies A, B, F, G, H, and K were guards at the execution of 38 Santee Sioux in Mankato.  Companies D, E, and H of the 9th Minnesota were posted there too. The Regiment was part of Col. Sibleys force at the Battle of Big Mound, Battle of Buffalo Lake, and the Battle of Stony Lake.  On May 4 1863 Company G boarded the riverboat Davenport at Fort Snelling as the escort of the first eastern Dakota to leave the Pike island encampment.  The Davenport and the G Company made three trips south with native Americans.   Afterwards the Regiment was sent south to the District of St. Louis. From there they joined the 1st Brigade, 1st Division Army of Tennessee and later the 16th Army Corps in west Mississippi. The 10th Minnesota Infantry was mustered out on August 18, 1865.

The 10th Minnesota Infantry suffered 2 officers and 35 enlisted men killed in action or who later died of their wounds, while 4 officers and 111 enlisted died of disease, for 152 fatalities total.

References

External links
 The Civil War Archive
 Narrative of the 10th Regiment, by Gen. J.H. Baker
 Minnesota Historical Society page on Minnesota and the Civil War

See also
List of Minnesota Civil War Units
9th Minnesota Infantry Regiment

Units and formations of the Union Army from Minnesota
1862 establishments in Minnesota
Military units and formations established in 1862
Military units and formations disestablished in 1865